Valerie Jane Beddoe,  (née McFarlane, born 15 October 1960) is an Australian former diver who competed in the 1980 and 1984 Summer Olympics, and in three Commonwealth Games. She won a gold medal in the 10m platform at the 1982 Commonwealth Games, having taken silver in the event in 1978. In her title defence in 1986, she came second behind Canada's Debbie Fuller to claim her second Commonwealth silver medal.

Awarded the Australian Sports Medal in 2000, Beddoe was appointed a Member of the Order of Australia in 2001 in recognition of her "service to diving as a competitor, coach and administrator."

References

1960 births
Australian female divers
Commonwealth Games gold medallists for Australia
Commonwealth Games silver medallists for Australia
Divers at the 1978 Commonwealth Games
Divers at the 1980 Summer Olympics
Divers at the 1982 Commonwealth Games
Divers at the 1984 Summer Olympics
Divers at the 1986 Commonwealth Games
Living people
Members of the Order of Australia
Olympic divers of Australia
Recipients of the Australian Sports Medal
Commonwealth Games medallists in diving
20th-century Australian women
21st-century Australian women
Medallists at the 1978 Commonwealth Games
Medallists at the 1982 Commonwealth Games
Medallists at the 1986 Commonwealth Games